Torvizcón is a municipality located in the province of Granada, Spain. According to the 2005 census (INE), the village has a population of 795 inhabitants.

References

Municipalities in the Province of Granada